Amsterdamsche Football Club Ajax, also known as AFC Ajax, Ajax Amsterdam, or simply Ajax, is a Dutch professional football club based in Amsterdam, that plays in the , the top tier in Dutch football. Historically, Ajax (named after the legendary Greek hero) is the most successful club in the Netherlands, with 36  and 20 KNVB Cups.

Ajax was one of the most successful clubs in the world in the 20th century. According to the International Federation of Football History & Statistics, Ajax were the seventh-most successful European club of the 20th century and The World's Club Team of the Year in 1992. According to German magazine Kicker, Ajax were the second-most successful European club of the 20th century. The club is one of five teams that have earned the right to keep the European Cup and to wear a multiple-winner badge. They also won the first (albeit unofficial) European Super Cup against Rangers in January 1973. Ajax's most recent international trophies are the 1995 Intercontinental Cup, 1995 UEFA Super Cup and the 1995 Champions League, where they defeated Milan in the final; they lost the 1996 Champions League final on penalties to Juventus. In 1995, Ajax was crowned as World Team of the Year by World Soccer magazine.

Ajax is also one of four teams to win the continental treble and the Intercontinental Cup or Club World Cup in the same season/calendar year; this was achieved in the 1971–72 season. Ajax are one of five clubs to have won all three major UEFA club competitions. They have also won the Intercontinental Cup twice, the 1991–92 UEFA Cup, as well as the Karl Rappan Cup, a predecessor of the UEFA Intertoto Cup in 1962. Ajax plays at the Johan Cruyff Arena, which opened as the Amsterdam ArenA in 1996 and was renamed in 2018. Throughout their history, Ajax have cultivated a reputation for scouting, spotting and developing young talent, and have remained focused on developing a youth system.

History

Ajax was founded in Amsterdam on 18 March 1900. The club achieved promotion to the highest level of Dutch football in 1911 and had its first major success in 1917, winning the KNVB Beker, the Netherlands' national cup. The following season, Ajax became national champion for the first time. The club defended its title in 1918–19, becoming the only team to achieve an unbeaten season in the Netherlands Football League Championship.

Throughout the 1920s, Ajax was a strong regional power, winning the Eerste Klasse West division in 1921, 1927 and 1928, but could not maintain its success at the national level. This changed in the 1930s, with the club winning five national championships (1931, 1932, 1934, 1937, 1939), making it the most successful Dutch team of the decade. Ajax won its second KNVB Cup in 1942–43, and an eighth Dutch title in 1946–47, the last season the club was managed by Englishman Jack Reynolds, who, up to this point, had overseen all of its national championship successes as well as its 1917 KNVB Cup win.

The Amsterdam club became the first national champions under the new format and made its debut in the European Champion Clubs' Cup the following year, losing to Hungarian champions  6–2 on aggregate at the quarter-final stage. The team were again  champions in 1960 and won a third KNVB Cup in 1961.

In 1965, Rinus Michels, who had played for the club between 1946 and 1958, was appointed manager of Ajax, implementing his philosophy of Total Football which was to become synonymous with both Ajax and the Netherlands national team. A year earlier, Johan Cruyff, who would go on to become widely regarded as the greatest Dutch footballer of all-time, made his debut. Between them, Michels and Cruyff led Ajax through the most successful period in its history, winning seven  titles, four KNVB Cups and three European Cups.

Ajax won the Dutch championship in 1966, 1967 and 1968, and reached the 1969 European Cup final, losing to Milan. During the 1966–67 season, Ajax scored a record 122 goals in an  season and also won the KNVB Cup to achieve its first league and cup double. In 1969–70, Ajax won a fourth Dutch league championship and second league and cup double in five seasons, winning 27 out of 34 league matches and scoring 100 goals.

The 1970–71 season saw Ajax retain the KNVB Cup and reach the 1971 European Cup final, where they defeated  2–0 with goals from Dick van Dijk and Arie Haan to become continental champions for the first time, with Cruyff being named European Footballer of the Year. After this success, Michels departed to become manager of Barcelona and was replaced by the Romanian Ștefan Kovács. The following season, the team beat Argentine  to win the 1972 Intercontinental Cup and retained their  and European Cup titles, becoming the first club to win three consecutive European Cups since Real Madrid in the 1950s.

In 1973, Michels' Barcelona broke the world transfer record to bring Cruyff to Catalonia. Kovács also departed to become manager of the France national team, signalling the end of this period of international success.

The early 1980s saw the return of Cruyff to the club, as well as the emergence of young players Marco van Basten and Frank Rijkaard. The team won back-to-back  titles in 1982 and 1983, with all three playing a significant role in the latter.

In 1985, Cruyff returned to Ajax as manager and the team ended his first season in charge with 120 goals from 34 matches. However, Ajax still finished as runner-up to PSV by eight points. The following season, Ajax again lost out on the  title to PSV, but won the European Cup Winners' Cup, its first continental trophy in 14 years. After this, Cruyff left the club to become manager of Barcelona and Rijkaard and van Basten were sold to Sporting CP and Milan respectively. Despite these losses, Ajax reached a second consecutive Cup Winners' Cup final in 1988, where they lost to Belgian club .

The 1988–89 season saw Dennis Bergkamp, a young forward who had first appeared under Cruyff in 1986, establish himself as a regular goalscorer for Ajax. Bergkamp helped Ajax to the  title and was the top scorer in the division in 1990–91, 1991–92 and 1992–93. Under the management of Louis van Gaal, Ajax won the UEFA Cup in 1992 to become the second club, after , to have won all three major European club competitions.

The team regained the Dutch championship in 1993–94, and won it again in 1994–95 and 1995–96 to become the first Ajax side to win three back-to-back championships since 1968. The height of van Gaal's success came in 1994–95, where Ajax became the first, and to date only, team to complete an entire  season unbeaten. The team also won its first European Cup since its 1970s era, defeating Milan in the 1995 UEFA Champions League final 1–0, with the winning goal scored by 18-year-old Patrick Kluivert.

Ajax's return as a European force was short-lived, as van Gaal and several members of the squad soon departed to some of the continent's biggest clubs. The 2000s was a lean decade for the club, with only two  championships won. However, Ajax's academy continued to produce star players such as Wesley Sneijder and Rafael van der Vaart.

In 2010, Frank de Boer was appointed manager of Ajax and led the club to its first league title in seven years, and record 30th title overall, in the 2010–11 season. This was followed by back-to-back wins in 2011–12 and 2012–13 to match his three consecutive titles as a player in the 1990s. In 2013–14, Ajax were again  champions, winning four consecutive league titles for the first time in club history. After finishing as runner-up to PSV in both 2014–15 and 2015–16, de Boer resigned as Ajax head coach in May 2016.

Peter Bosz took over the club and led them to the 2017 UEFA Europa League final, their first European final in 21 years. They lost to Manchester United with a lineup that was the youngest ever in a European final, averaging an age of 22 years and 282 days.

The 2018–19 season for Ajax involved a remarkable run in the UEFA Champions League. Due to their runner-up finish in the 2017–18 Eredivisie, Ajax entered the tournament in the second qualifying round. Ajax was drawn in a group with German champions Bayern Munich, Portuguese side Benfica and Greek champions AEK Athens. Ajax finished runner-up in this group, qualifying for the knockout stages, where they were drawn against three-time defending champions Real Madrid. After losing 1–2 in the first leg, they defeated Real Madrid 4–1 in the away match, stunning the defending champions in their own stadium, the Santiago Bernabéu, with an aggregate score of 5–3. Dušan Tadić was awarded a perfect score of 10 by  following the match.
 
Thus, Ajax progressed to the quarter-finals and were drawn with Italian champions . In the first leg in the Johan Cruyff Arena, they drew 1–1. In the second leg at the Juventus Stadium, Ajax came from behind to win 2–1 and 3–2 on aggregate. Matthijs de Ligt scored the winning goal for Ajax to help the team advance to its first Champions League semi-final since 1997. There, they would face English side Tottenham Hotspur.

In the first leg of the semi-final, Ajax beat Tottenham 1–0 away from home. In the second leg, Ajax scored twice in the first half to generate a 3–0 lead on aggregate. However, in the second half, Lucas Moura scored three times, including in the 6th minute of added time, resulting in Ajax losing via the away goals rule.

UEFA ranking

Academies (Youth/Coaching)

The club is also particularly famous for its renowned youth programme that has produced many Dutch talents over the years – Johan Cruyff, Edwin van der Sar, Gerald Vanenburg, Frank Rijkaard, Dennis Bergkamp, Rafael van der Vaart, Patrick Kluivert, Marco van Basten, Wesley Sneijder, Maarten Stekelenburg, Nigel de Jong, Frenkie de Jong, and Matthijs de Ligt have come through the ranks and are just some of the talents who have played for Ajax. Ajax also regularly supplies the Dutch national youth teams with local talent.

Due to mutual agreements with foreign clubs, the youth academy has also signed foreign players as teenagers before making first team debuts, such as Belgian defensive trio Jan Vertonghen, Toby Alderweireld and Thomas Vermaelen along with winger Tom De Mul, all of whom are full internationals, as well as Dutch international Vurnon Anita and Javier Martina, representing Curaçao.

Ajax has also expanded its talent searching programme to South Africa with Ajax Cape Town. Ajax Cape Town was set up with the help of Rob Moore. Ajax has also had a satellite club in the United States under the name Ajax America, until it filed for bankruptcy. There are some youth players from Ajax Cape Town that have been drafted into the  squad, such as South African internationals Steven Pienaar and Thulani Serero and Cameroonian international Eyong Enoh.

In 1995, the year Ajax won the UEFA Champions League, the Netherlands national team was almost entirely composed of Ajax players, with van der Sar in goal; players such as Michael Reiziger, Frank de Boer and Danny Blind in defence; Ronald de Boer, Edgar Davids and Clarence Seedorf in midfield; and Patrick Kluivert and Marc Overmars in attack.

In 2011, Ajax opened its first youth academies outside the Netherlands when the club partnered up with George Kazianis and All Star Consultancy in Greece to open the Ajax Hellas Youth Academy. The offices are based in Nea Smyrni, Attica, with the main training facility located on the island of Corfu, hosting a total of 15 football youth academies throughout Greece and Cyprus. Eddie van Schaik heads the organization as coach and consultant, introducing the Ajax football philosophy at the various Greek football training camps.

In 2016, Ajax launched the ACA (Ajax Coaching Academy) with the intention of sharing knowledge, and setting up a variety of camps and clinics for both players and coaches.

Stadiums

Ajax's first stadium was built in 1911 out of wood and was called Het Houten Stadion (English: The Wooden Stadium). Ajax later played in the Olympic Stadium built for the 1928 Summer Olympics hosted in Amsterdam. In 1934, Ajax moved to De Meer Stadion in east Amsterdam, close to the location of Het Houten Stadion. It was designed by architect and Ajax-member Daan Roodenburgh, who had also designed the club's first stadium. It could accommodate 29,500 spectators and Ajax continued to play there until 1996. For big European and national fixtures, the club would often play at the Olympic Stadium, which could accommodate about twice the number of spectators.

In 1996, Ajax moved to a new home ground in the southeast of the city known as the Amsterdam Arena, since 2018 known as the Johan Cruyff Arena. This stadium was built by the Amsterdam city authority at a cost of $134 million. The stadium is capable of holding 55,865 spectators. The Arena has a retractable roof and set a trend for other modern stadiums built in Europe in the following years. In the Netherlands, the Arena earned a reputation for a terrible grass pitch caused by the removable roof that, even when open, takes away too much sunlight and fresh air. During the 2008–09 season, ground staff introduced an artificial lighting system that finally reduced this problem considerably.

The much-loved De Meer Stadion was torn down and the land was sold to the city council. A residential neighbourhood now occupies the area. The only thing left of the old stadium are the letters "AJAX", which nowadays is in place on the façade of the youth training grounds De Toekomst, near the Johan Cruyff Arena.

Crest and colours

Crest
In 1900, when the club was founded, the emblem of Ajax was just a picture of an Ajax player. The crest was slightly altered following the club's promotion to the top division in 1911 to match the club's new outfits. In 1928, the club logo was introduced with the head of the Greek hero Ajax. The logo was once again changed in 1990 into an abstract version of the previous one. The new logo still sports the portrait of Ajax, but drawn with just 11 lines, symbolizing the 11 players of a football team.

Colours

Ajax originally played in an all-black uniform with a red sash tied around the players' waists, but that uniform was soon replaced by a red/white striped shirt and black shorts. Red, black and white are the three colours of the flag of Amsterdam. When under manager Jack Kirwan, however, the club earned promotion to the top flight of Dutch football for the first time in 1911 (then the Eerste Klasse or 'First Class', later named the ), Ajax were forced to change their colours because Sparta Rotterdam already had exactly the same outfit. Special kits for away fixtures did not exist at the time and according to football association regulations the newcomers had to change their colours if two teams in the same league had identical uniforms. Ajax opted for white shorts and white shirt with a broad, vertical red stripe over chest and back, which still is Ajax's outfit.

Financial

AFC Ajax N.V.

AFC Ajax is the only Dutch club with an initial public offering (IPO). The club is registered as a Naamloze vennootschap (N.V.) listed on the stock exchange Euronext Amsterdam, since 17 May 1998. With a launch price of ƒ25,- (Guilders) the club managed to a bring their total revenue up to €54 million (converted) in their first year on the market. After short-lived success, however, the rate dropped, at one point as low as €3.50. Criticism was brought forth that the legal grid for a naamloze vennootschap would not be suitable for a Football club, and that the sports related ambitions would suffer from the new commercial interests of the now listed Ajax. Shares of the company in the year 2008 were valued at approximately €5.90 per share.

In 2008, a Commission under guidance of honorary member Uri Coronel concluded that the IPO was of no value to the club, and that measures should be taken to exit the stock exchange by purchasing back all public shares. Ajax remain on the stock exchange.

Sponsorship

Ajax's shirts have been sponsored by TDK from 1982 to 1991, and by ABN AMRO from 1991 to 2008. AEGON then replaced ABN AMRO as the new head sponsor for a period of seven years. On 1 April 2007, Ajax wore a different sponsor for the match against Heracles Almelo, Florius. Florius is a banking programme launched by ABN AMRO who wanted it to be the shirt sponsor for one match.

The shirts have been manufactured by Le Coq Sportif (1973–1977), Puma (1977–1979), Cor du Buy (1979-1980), Le Coq Sportif (1980–1984), Kappa (1985–1989) and Umbro (1989–2000) in the past, and by Adidas since 2000 (until at least 2025).

At the conclusion of the 2013–14 season, Ajax won the Football shirt of the Year award for their black and rose colored away shirt by Adidas. The annual award was presented by Subside Sports, which had previously given the award to Internazionale, Juventus and the Belgium national team. It was Ajax's first time winning the award.

On 7 November 2014, it was announced that Ajax had agreed to a four-and-a-half-year contract worth €8 million annually with Dutch cable operating company Ziggo as the new shirt sponsor for the club. Having extended their contract with AEGON for half a season until December, the club featured Fonds Gehandicaptensport, a charitable fund for handicapped sports on its away shirts for a six-month period before transitioning to Ziggo in 2015.

Kit suppliers and shirt sponsors

Kit deals

Other teams

Reserves team

Jong Ajax (formerly more commonly known as Ajax 2) is the reserve team of AFC Ajax. The team is composed mostly of professional footballers, who are often recent graduates from the highest youth level (Ajax A1) serving their first professional contract as a reserve, or players who are otherwise unable to play in the first team.

Since 1992, Jong Ajax competed in the Beloften Eredivisie, competing against other reserve teams such as Jong PSV, Jong FC Groningen or Jong AZ. They have won the Beloften  title a record eight times, as well as the KNVB Reserve Cup three times, making them the most successful reserve squad in the Netherlands. By winning the Beloften Eredivisie title, Jong Ajax were able to qualify for the actual KNVB Cup, even advancing to the semi-finals on three occasions. Their best result in the Dutch Cup was under manager Jan Olde Riekerink in 2001–02, when a semi-final loss to Utrecht in a Penalty shoot-out after extra time, which saw Utrecht advance, and thus preventing an Ajax–Jong Ajax Dutch Cup final.

The 2013–14 season marked the Jupiler League debut of the Ajax reserves' squad, Jong Ajax. Previously playing in the Beloften Eredivisie (a separate league for reserve teams, not included in the Dutch professional or amateur league structure), players were allowed to move around freely between the reserve team and the first team during the season. This is no longer the case as Jong Ajax now registers and fields a separate squad from that of Ajax first team for the Eerste Divisie, the second tier of professional football in the Netherlands. Their home matches are played at Sportpark De Toekomst, except for the occasional match in the Johan Cruyff Arena. Now regarded a semi-professional team in their own respect, the only period in which players are able to move between squads are during the transfer windows, unless the player has made less than 15 appearances for the first team, then he is still eligible to appear in both first team and second team matches during the season. Jong Ajax were joined in the Eerste Divisie by Jong Twente and Jong PSV, reserve teams who have also moved from the Beloften  to the Eerste Divisie, in place of VV Katwijk, SC Veendam and AGOVV Apeldoorn, increasing the total number of teams in the Jupiler League from 18 to 20.

Ajax reserve squad Jong Ajax left the Beloften Eredivisie in 2013, having held a 21-year tenure in the reserves league, having also won the league title a record eight times (1994, 1996, 1998, 2001, 2002, 2004, 2005, 2009).

Women's team

AFC Ajax Vrouwen (English: AFC Ajax Women) are the women's team of AFC Ajax, competing in the women's eredivisie, the highest level of women's football in the Netherlands. Founded on 18 May 2012, the women's team saw Ajax attracting many of the Netherlands top talents, with International players such as Anouk Hoogendijk, Daphne Koster and Petra Hogewoning joining the Amsterdam club in its maiden season in women's professional football. The team won their first piece of silverware when they defeated PSV/FC Eindhoven 2–1 in the final of the KNVB Women's Cup.

Amateur team

AFC Ajax Amateurs, better known as Ajax Zaterdag, is a Dutch amateur football club founded 18 March 1900. It is the amateur team of the professional club AFC Ajax, who play their home matches at the Sportpark De Toekomst training grounds to a capacity of 5,000. The team was promoted from the Eerste Klasse to the Hoofdklasse ahead of the 2011–12 season, the league in which they are currently competing. The team has won the Eerste Klasse title twice, as well as the *KNVB District Cup West I on two occasions as well.

Furthermore, Ajax Zaterdag have also managed to qualify for the KNVB Cup on their own accord on three occasions, namely in 2004, 2005, 2008 and 2021. Even advancing to the second round before bowing out to Vitesse on 24 September 2008.

Other sports

Baseball

Ajax HVA (1922–1972) was the baseball team of AFC Ajax founded in 1922, and competed as founding members of the Honkbal Hoofdklasse, the top flight of professional baseball in the Netherlands. Ajax won the national baseball title a total of four times (1924, 1928, 1942, 1948) before the club opted to no longer field a baseball team, and to focus solely on football in 1972. Ajax spent a total of 50 years at the top flight of Baseball in the Netherlands from 1922 to 1972. The dissolution of Ajax baseball club resulted in the players finding a new sponsor in a mustard manufacturing company called Luycks, while merging with the Diemen Giants to become the Luycks Giants, thus replacing both former clubs.

Esports

In 2016, Ajax launched an esports team, with Koen Weijland as the club's first signing, making their debut on the Global stage of professional gaming. They have since signed the likes of Dani Hagebeuk, Lev Vinken, Joey Calabro and Bob van Uden, the latter spent his first season on loan to the esports team of Japanese club Sagan Tosu.

Affiliated clubs

The following clubs are currently affiliated with AFC Ajax:
  Almere City (2005–present)
  Barcelona (2007–present)
  Cruzeiro (2007–present)
  Beijing Guoan (2007–present)
  Palmeiras (2010–present)
  AS Trenčín (2012–present)
  Guangzhou R&F (2017–present)
  Sagan Tosu (2018–present)
  Sharjah FC (2020–present)
  Sydney FC (2018–present)
  Sparta Rotterdam (2019–present)
  Various HETT-clubs (See main article)
The following clubs were affiliated with AFC Ajax in the past:
  Germinal Beerschot (1999–2003)
  Ashanti Goldfields (1999–2003)
  Ajax Orlando Prospects (2003–2007)
  HFC Haarlem (2006–2010)
  Volendam (2007–2010)
  Ajax Cape Town (1999–2020)

Rivalries
As one of the traditional big three clubs in the Netherlands, Ajax have amassed a number of intense rivalries over the years. Listed below are the most significant of the rivalries involving Ajax.

Rivalry with Feyenoord

Feyenoord from Rotterdam are Ajax's archrivals. Every year both clubs play the De Klassieker ("The Classic"), a match between the teams from the two largest cities of the Netherlands. During the 1970s, Ajax and Feyenoord were the only two clubs in the Netherlands who were able to clinch national titles, as well as achieve continental and even global success. A meeting between the two clubs became the measure for who was truly the best club in the Netherlands. The Klassieker is the most famous of all the rivalries in the Netherlands and the matches are always sold out. The fixture is seen in the public eye as "the graceful and elegant football of Ajax, against the indomitable fighting spirit of Feyenoord"; the confidence of the capital city versus the blue collar mentality of Rotterdam. Matches are known for their tension and violence, both on and off the pitch. Over the years, several violent incidents have taken place involving rival supporters, leading to the current prohibition of away supporters in both stadiums. The lowest point was reached on 23 March 1997, when supporters of both clubs met on a field near Beverwijk, where Ajax-supporter Carlo Picornie was fatally injured, the incident is commonly referred to as the "Battle of Beverwijk".

Rivalry with PSV

PSV are also a rival of Ajax, but in terms of tension and rivalry, these matches are not as loaded as the duels with Feyenoord. The rivalry has existed for some time with PSV and stems from various causes, such as the different interpretations of whether current national and international successes of both clubs correlates and the supposed opposition between the Randstad and the province. The matches between these two teams is commonly referred to as "De Topper" ("The Topper"), and involves the two most trophy-laden sides in Dutch football and is essentially a clash of two competing schools of thought in Dutch football. Historically, PSV compete with a workmanlike ethic, preferring a more robust 4–3–1–2 or 4–2–3–1, typically shunning the frivolous 4–3–3 approach favoured in Amsterdam. While Rinus Michels and Johan Cruyff helped to innovate Total Football in the sixties and seventies, a different philosophy was honed in Eindhoven by Kees Rijvers and Guus Hiddink in the late 1970s and '80s. This in turn has created one of the more philosophical rivalries in football, an ideological battleground, which is gradually becoming as heated and intense as the matches Ajax and Feyenoord partake in.

Rivalries with other clubs

Aside from Feyenoord and PSV, Ajax have several other rivalries, although in most cases the sentiment is mostly felt by the opposition and is more directed towards Ajax, with one of them being Utrecht. Although the rivalry is more felt on the Utrecht side then with Ajax, matchups between the two sides are often quite intense. Both teams have fanatic supporters, and clashes off the pitch are more often the rule than the exception. The same goes for ADO Den Haag, with both supporter groups often getting in conflicts, when ADO-Hooligans set fire to the supporters home of Ajax, and Ajax hooligans subsequently broke into the Supporters home of ADO tensions between the two clubs rose. In 2006, supporters from both clubs were banned from attending away matches for five years due to frequent violent outbreaks and clashes.

Further teams who share a rivalry with Ajax include Twente, Vitesse Arnhem, Groningen and AZ, although the latter is often regarded by Ajax supporters as the club's "little brother". With AZ being from nearby Alkmaar and therefore situated in the same province as Ajax, match-ups between the two sides are commonly known as the "De Noord-Hollandse Derby" ("North Holland Derby") and are often very competitive, intense and loaded fixtures.

Past rivalries include local Amsterdam derbies between Ajax and clubs such as Blauw-Wit, DWS and De Volewijckers (which later merged to become FC Amsterdam in 1972). However, the tension between the local sides lessened as the division of the clubs through playing in different leagues over time became greater. Years of not competing in the same league resulted in less frequent match-ups, until tensions finally settled between the Amsterdam clubs. The last Amsterdam derby to take place in an official league match was when Ajax defeated FC Amsterdam 5–1 on 19 March 1978.

Supporters

Ajax are known for having fanatic core supporter-groups, of which F-Side and VAK410 are the most famous. F-Side were founded on 3 October 1976, and are situated right behind the goal in the Johan Cruyff Arena, on the southern end of the stadium in rows 125–129. Their name is derived from the group's former location on the F-side of the old De Meer Stadion. The F-side supporters are responsible for a big part of the atmosphere in the stadium, but are also known for rioting during and after matches. If in any match Ajax should win the coin toss, the second half of the match Ajax always play towards the south-end of the stadium. VAK410 (English: Row 410) were founded in 2001 and are situated in the Zuidhoek (South corner) of the stadium on the upper ring in rows 424–425. The group was originally situated on the North-West side of the stadium in row 410, from where it derives its name, until relocating to their current place in the stands in 2008. Members of VAK410 are known to perform various stunts, which include massive banners, to enhance the atmosphere in the stadium. Neither F-Side or VAK410 have seats in their sections of the stadium, and both groups stand for the duration of the match.

Through the official Football Top 20 of Dutch sports research group SPORT+MARKT, it was revealed in 2010 that Ajax had approximately 7.1 million supporters throughout Europe. This is significantly more than rivals Feyenoord and PSV (each 1.6 and 1.3 million, respectively), which puts Ajax as the club with the 15th-most supporters across Europe. The study also revealed that approximately 39% of the Netherlands were Ajax supporters. Not only does Ajax have many supporters, but several fans attend their matches in European competition, with an average attendance of 48,677 spectators for every international match Ajax played, putting the team at 12th place in Europe for highest attendance, ahead of high-profile clubs such as Milan and Chelsea. It is noteworthy that not all stadiums share the capacity of the Johan Cruyff Arena.

Supporters clubs

The Supporters Club Ajax is officially the largest supporters club in the Netherlands with 94,000 members. Founded on 7 May 1992, the supporters club organize big monthly events throughout the Netherlands, and particularly around the official Ajax Open Training Day, which attracts thousands of supporters each year. Furthermore, the supporters group is responsible for the Ajax Life website, as well as the fanzine which is issued 20 times a year. 

In 2006, the AFCA Supportersclub was introduced as the club's second official supporters' association, through the merger of the Onafhankelijke Fanclub Ajax (OFA) and the Ajax Supporters Delegatie (ASD). The AFCA Supportersclub has a reported 42,000 members, as well as a former member on the Board of Administration of Ajax, in Ronald Pieloor.

The third official supporters club is the Ajax Business Associates (ABA). Founded in 1991 the ABA is the Business club of Ajax. Members occupy the skyboxes in the Stadium and can make use of the clubs' amenities and luxury suites including the ABA club and lounge.  The ABA is also responsible for hosting the annual Ajax Business Golf Trophy, an amateur golf tournament where several active and former Ajax players, as well as prominent people and members of the ABA, participate.

Average attendance
This graph displays the average attendance for home matches of Ajax from 1988 to 2018, whereby the difference in capacity of the De Meer Stadion and the Johan Cruyff Arena (est. 1996) is clearly visible.

Mascot
 Lucky Lynx, is the official team mascot. (2000–present)

Jewish connection

Historically, Ajax was popularly seen as having "Jewish roots". While it had fewer Jewish players than WV-HEDW, Ajax has had a Jewish image since the 1930s when the home stadium was located next to a Jewish neighbourhood of Amsterdam-Oost and opponents saw many supporters walking through the Nieuwmarkt/Waterloopleinbuurt (de Jodenhoek—the "Jews' corner") to get to the stadium. The city of Amsterdam was historically referred to as a Mokum city, Mokum (מקום) being the Yiddish word for "place" or "safe haven", and as anti-Semitic chants and name calling developed and intensified at the old De Meer Stadion from frustrated supporters of opposing clubs, Ajax fans (few of whom are actually Jewish) responded by embracing Ajax's "Jewish" identity: calling themselves "super Jews", chanting "Jews, Jews" ("Joden, Joden") at games, and adopting Jewish symbols such as the Star of David and the Israeli flag. 

This Jewish imagery eventually became a central part of Ajax fans' culture. At one point ringtones of "Hava Nagila", a Hebrew folk song, could be downloaded from the club's official website. Beginning in the 1980s, fans of Ajax's rivals escalated their antisemitic rhetoric, chanting slogans like "Hamas, Hamas/Jews to the gas" ("Hamas, hamas, joden aan het gas"), hissing to imitate the flow of gas, giving Nazi salutes, and other things. The eventual result was that many (genuinely) Jewish Ajax fans stopped going to games.

In the 2000s, the club began trying to persuade fans to drop their Jewish image. In 2013, a documentary titled Superjews was released by NTR and Viewpoint Productions which premiered at the International Documentary Film Festival Amsterdam (IDFA). The film was directed by Nirit Peled, an Israeli living in Amsterdam, and an independent film maker who offers a very personal view into the game, the lore of Ajax and its relation to Judaism from both the supporters as well as from a Jewish perspective.

Players

Current squad

Players out on loan

Retired numbers  

14 –  Johan Cruyff (Forward, 1964–73, 1981–83). Number retired on 25 April 2007 at Cruyff's 60th birthday celebration match.

Notes:

Youth/reserves squad
For the reserve squad of Ajax see: Jong Ajax.

Notable former players

Board and staff

Current board
Executive Board
Chairman:  Frank Eijken
Board members: 6 – ( Jan Buskermolen,  Ruud Haarms,  Wendy Nagel,  Cees van Oevelen,  Maarten Oldenhof and  Marc Stuut)

Board of Directors
General director:  Edwin van der Sar
Financial director:  Susan Lenderink
Marketing director:  Menno Geelen
Director of football: 2 – ( Gerry Hamstra,  Klaas-Jan Huntelaar)

Supervisory Board
Chairman:  Leen Meijaard
Board members: 4 – ( Annette Mosman,  Ernst Ligthart,  Peter Mensing,  Georgette Schlick)

Current staff
Coaching staff
Head coach:  John Heitinga
Assistant coach:  Michael Reiziger
Member of coaching staff:  Richard Witschge
Goalkeeper coach:  Anton Scheutjens

Medical staff
Team doctor:  Bas Peijs
Team doctor:  Don de Winter
Physiotherapist:  Ralph van der Horst
Physiotherapist:  Pim van Dord
Physiotherapist:  Frank van Deursen
Fitness coach / Recovery trainer:  Björn Rekelhof

Accompanying staff
Team manager:  Jan Siemerink
Players supervisor:  Herman Pinkster
Performance coach:  Alessandro Schoenmakers
Press officer:  Miel Brinkhuis

List of Ajax chairmen

  Floris Stempel (1900–08)
  Chris Holst (1908–10)
  Han Dade (1910–12)
  Chris Holst (1912–13)
  Willem Egeman (1913–25)
  Frans Schoevaart (1925–32)
  Marius Koolhaas (1932–56)
  Wim Volkers (1956–58)
  Jan Melchers (1958–64)
  Jaap van Praag (1964–78)
  Ton Harmsen (1978–88)
  Michael van Praag (1989–2003)
  John Jaakke (2003–08)
  Uri Coronel (2008–11)
  Hennie Henrichs (2011–20)
  Frank Eijken (2020–present)

List of Ajax coaches

  Jack Kirwan (1910–15)
  Jack Reynolds (1915–25)
  Harold Rose (1925–26)
  Stanley Castle (1926–28)
  Jack Reynolds (1928–40)
  Vilmos Halpern (1940–41)
  Wim Volkers (1941–42)
  Dolf van Kol (1942–45)
  Jack Reynolds (1945–47)
  Robert Smith (1947–48)
  Walter Crook (1948–50)
  Robert Thomson (1950–52)
  Karel Kaufman (1952–53)
  Walter Crook (1953–54)
  Karl Humenberger (1954–59)
  Vic Buckingham (1959–61)
  Keith Spurgeon (1961–62)
  Joseph Gruber (1962–63)
  Jack Rowley (1963–64)
  Vic Buckingham (1964–65)
  Rinus Michels (1965–71)
  Ștefan Kovács (1971–73)
  George Knobel (1973–74)
  Bobby Haarms (1974, interim)
  Hans Kraay (1974–75)
  Jan van Daal (1975, interim)
  Rinus Michels (1975–76)
  Tomislav Ivić (1976–78)
  Cor Brom (1978–79)
  Leo Beenhakker (1979–81)
  Aad de Mos (1981, interim)
  Kurt Linder (1981–82)
  Aad de Mos (1982–85)
    Antoine Kohn, Tonny Bruins Slot, and Cor van der Hart (1985, interim)
  Johan Cruyff (1985–88)
  Kurt Linder (1988)
    Antoine Kohn, Bobby Haarms, and Barry Hulshoff (1988–89, interim)
  Leo Beenhakker (1989–91)
  Louis van Gaal (1991–97)
  Morten Olsen (1997–99)
  Jan Wouters (1999–2000)
  Hans Westerhof (2000, interim)
  Co Adriaanse (2000–01)
  Ronald Koeman (2001–05)
  Ruud Krol (2005, interim)
  Danny Blind (2005–06)
  Henk ten Cate (2006–07)
  Adrie Koster (2007–08, interim)
  Marco van Basten (2008–09)
  John van 't Schip (2009, interim)
  Martin Jol (2009–10)
  Frank de Boer (2010–16)
  Peter Bosz (2016–17)
  Marcel Keizer (2017)
  Erik ten Hag (2017–2022)
  Alfred Schreuder (2022–2023)
  John Heitinga (2023–)

Honours

Official trophies (recognized by UEFA and FIFA)

National
Netherlands Football League Championship / Eredivisie (36; record): 
 1917–18, 1918–19, 1930–31, 1931–32, 1933–34, 1936–37, 1938–39, 1946–47, 1956–57, 1959–60, 1965–66, 1966–67, 1967–68, 1969–70, 1971–72, 1972–73, 1976–77, 1978–79, 1979–80, 1981–82, 1982–83, 1984–85, 1989–90, 1993–94, 1994–95, 1995–96, 1997–98, 2001–02, 2003–04, 2010–11, 2011–12, 2012–13, 2013–14, 2018–19, 2020–21, 2021–22
KNVB Cup (20; record):
 1916–17, 1942–43, 1960–61, 1966–67, 1969–70, 1970–71, 1971–72, 1978–79, 1982–83, 1985–86, 1986–87, 1992–93, 1997–98, 1998–99, 2001–02, 2005–06, 2006–07, 2009–10, 2018–19, 2020–21
Johan Cruyff Shield (9):
 1993, 1994, 1995, 2002, 2005, 2006, 2007, 2013, 2019

European

European Cup / UEFA Champions League (4; Dutch record):
 1970–71, 1971–72, 1972–73, 1994–95
European Cup Winners' Cup (1; Dutch record):
 1986–87
UEFA Cup (1):
 1991–92
Super Competition / UEFA Super Cup (2; Dutch record):
 1973, 1995 Ajax also won in 1972, however UEFA only sanctioned the UEFA Super Cup for the first time in 1973 so the 1972 edition was an unofficial one. Played against Rangers, winners of the 1971–72 European Cup Winners' Cup, it actually went ahead as 'a celebration of the Centenary of Rangers F.C.' (see below) because Rangers were serving a one-year ban at the time, imposed by UEFA for the misbehaviour of their fans. That victory meant Ajax had won every tournament (5 in total) they entered that year, a feat Celtic achieved in 1967 (with 6 trophies), Barcelona in 2009 (6 trophies), and Bayern in 2020 (also 6 trophies).

Worldwide
Intercontinental Cup (2; Dutch record):
 1972, 1995

Other trophies
Ajax have won numerous friendly tournaments, unsanctioned by UEFA or FIFA, including the Amsterdam Tournament, Bruges Matins Trophy, Trofeo Santiago Bernabéu, Eusébio Cup, Ted Bates Trophy, Jalkapalloturnaus and Chippie Polar Cup. (For a complete list, see the list of AFC Ajax honours)

Club Awards
World Soccer World Team of the Year : 1
 1995
France Football European Team of the Year : 4
 1969, 1971, 1972, 1973
Dutch Sports Team of the Year : 5
 1968, 1969, 1972, 1987, 1995
Sports Team of the Year : 1
 1990
Dick van Rijn Trophy : 1
 1995
Amsterdam Sportsteam of the year: 3
 2011, 2013, 2014
ING Fair Play Award : 2
 2013, 2014
Fair Play Cup : 1
 1995
FIFA Club of the Century : shared 5th place
 20th Century
kicker Sportmagazin Club of the Century: 2nd place
 20th Century
Best Dutch club after 50 years of professional football : 1
 2004
Football shirt of the Year : Ajax away shirt by adidas
 2013–14
The Four-Four-Two Greatest Club Side Ever : Ajax (1965–1973)
 2013
VVCS Best Pitch of the Year : 1
 2012

Honorary club members
Ajax have a total of 45 honorary club members, from people who have been invested within the club's administrative engagements, to committed players who have excelled in the athletic department. Of those 45 members 40 have since died. Five members still remain, having been reduced from eight members after Piet Keizer renounced his membership, seven after the passing of Johan Cruyff and six after the passing of Uri Coronel.

  Hennie Henrichs
  Arie van Os
  Michael van Praag
  Rob Been
  Sjaak Swart

The remaining 40 honorary members who have since died:

  Floris Stempel
  Han Dade
  Chris Holst
  L.W. van Fliet
  K.W.F. van der Lee
  Henk Alofs
  Frans Schoevaart
  Jan Grootmeijer
  J. Oudheusden
  Willem Egeman
  Jan Schoevaart
  Marius Koolhaas
  Jordanus Roodenburgh
  Theo Brokmann
  F.H.W. de Bruijn
  Jan de Boer
  Frans Couton
  A.L. Desmit
  Wim Anderiesen
  Wim Volkers
  Jan Elzenga
  Roef Vunderink
  Kick Geudeker
  G. de Jongh
  Jack Reynolds
  Ferry Dukker
  Arie de Wit
  W.F.C. Bruijnesteijn
  Jan Westrik
  Jaap van Praag
  Henk Hordijk
  M.J.W. Middendorp
  Rinus Michels
  Henk Timman
  Jan Potharst
  Bobby Haarms
  André Kraan
  Willem Schoevaart
  Johan Cruyff
  Uri Coronel

Results

Domestic results

Continental results

Team records

 Most match appearances: 463 – Sjaak Swart
 Most goals scored: 273 – Piet van Reenen
 Most goals scored in a season: 41 – Henk Groot
 First Ajax player to receive an International cap: Gerard Fortgens for the Netherlands in 1911
 First Ajax player to score a goal for the national team: Theo Brokmann for the Netherlands in 1919

Club van 100

The Club van 100 is the official list of Football players who have appeared in one hundred or more official matches for AFC Ajax. The club currently has a total of over 150 members. The record for league appearances is held by Mr. Ajax himself Sjaak Swart, who appeared in 463 league matches for Ajax. There is a beneficiary team called Lucky Ajax, which was initiated by Sjaak Swart. Lucky Ajax participate in at least one match a year, usually in the name of charity, and commonly at football ceremonies to bid farewell to retiring players. One of the prerequisites for playing on Lucky Ajax, which is invitational only, is that you are a member of the Club van 100, having made at least 100 official match appearances for Ajax in the first team of the club.

Lucky Ajax
Lucky Ajax are a beneficiary team that was initiated by Sjaak Swart in the seventies, competing in at least one match a year, usually in the name of charity and/or to bid farewell to retiring former Ajax players. The team is made up of various members of the Club van 100 of Ajax who will come out of retirement for this match to face the Ajax squad that is current of that year. Past participants have included Barry Hulshoff, Sonny Silooy, Simon Tahamata, Ronald Koeman, Tscheu La Ling, Gerrie Mühren, John van 't Schip, Brian Roy, Stanley Menzo, Peter van Vossen and Fred Grim. The name Lucky Ajax is derived from the famous "Lucky Ajax" nickname from how people used to refer to the club when Ajax would either win a match by chance, by a decision of a referee, or by coincidence such as was said to be the case during the infamous Mistwedstrijd ("Fog Match").

Number 14 shirt

As of the 2007–08 season, no player could wear the number 14 shirt at Ajax after the club decided to retire the shirt out of respect for Johan Cruyff, "the legendary number fourteen". Cruyff himself laughed off the tribute, saying the club had to let its best player play with number 14. Spanish midfielder Roger was the last player to wear the number. Marvin Zeegelaar wore the shirt number In preparation for the 2011–12 season in one preseason match, while Aras Özbiliz wore the number 14 shirt in one pre-season match ahead of the 2011–12 season as well. The club stated that this was, in fact, not done in error.

Below is a list of all players to wear the number 14 shirt since Johan Cruyff's departure.

Former captains

Team tournaments

Amsterdam Tournament

Established in 1975 as the Amsterdam 700 Tournament to celebrate 700 years of history in the city. The tournament was hosted annually each summer by Ajax until 1992, when the last edition of the original tournament was played. It returned in 1999 with the backing of the International Event Partnership (IEP). Four teams participated in the competition, played in a league format since 1986. Since its return, the tournament used an unusual point scoring system. As with most league competitions, three points were awarded for a win, one for a draw, and none for a loss. An additional point, however, was awarded for each goal scored. The system was designed to reward teams that adopted a more attacking style of play. Each entrant played two matches, with the winner being the club that finished at the top of the table. The original competition was held at Het Olympisch Stadion where Ajax played the bigget games until 1996. The Amsterdam Arena (now Johan Cruyff Arena) played host to the event since its return until the last edition was played in 2009. Ajax is the most successful team of the tournament, having won it a record ten times, while Benfica from Portugal were the last team to win the tournament, in 2009.

Copa Amsterdam

Established in 2005, the Copa Amsterdam is an international friendly football tournament for Under-19 youth teams, that is organized by Ajax and the Amsterdam city council, which takes place at the Olympic Stadium as part of the annual Amsterdam Sports Weekend, a citywide sponsored initiative to promote 'sports and recreation' within the city of Amsterdam. Each Summer the city of Amsterdam and Ajax invite U-19 teams from various top clubs from around the World to participate in the tournament. Seven teams are invited and play in the competition every year. Over the years, clubs such as Barcelona, Juventus, Chelsea and Real Madrid have had their senior youth teams participate in the tournament. Cruzeiro from Brazil are the most successful club in the history of the tournament, having won it three times in total.

Future Cup

Established in 2010, the AEGON Future Cup is an international friendly tournament for Under-17 youth teams, which is organized by AFC Ajax and their main sponsor, the insurance company AEGON. The tournament is held each year at the Johan Cruyff Arena and at the Sportpark De Toekomst, the team's training ground, which also inspired the name of the competition, since De Toekomst in Dutch means The Future. Every year during the Easter weekend, six U-17 teams are invited to participate in the competition, while the seventh place for the contesters is reserved for the winners of the "Craques Mongeral AEGON Future Cup" in Brazil, the sister competition of the tournament in South America. Youth teams from top clubs such as Manchester United, Bayern Munich, Milan and many more have participated in the competition over the years. Ajax are the most successful club of the tournament, having won the trophy a total of five times.

See also

 List of football clubs in the Netherlands

Bibliography
 David Endt, De godenzonen van Ajax, Rap, Amsterdam, 1993, 
 Jan Baltus Kok, Naar Ajax. Mobiliteitspatronen van bezoekers bij vier thuiswedstrijden van Ajax, University of Amsterdam, Amsterdam, 1992, 
Simon Kuper, Ajax, The Dutch, The War. Football in Europe during the Second World War, Orion Books, London (Translation of: Ajax, de Joden en Nederland ("Ajax, the Jews, The Netherlands)", 2003, 
 Evert Vermeer, 95 jaar Ajax. 1900–1995, Luitingh-Sijthoff, Amsterdam, 1996,

External links

AFC Ajax  at weltfussballarchiv
AFC Ajax at soccerway

References

 
Football clubs in Amsterdam
Football clubs in the Netherlands
1900 establishments in the Netherlands
Association football clubs established in 1900
G-14 clubs
Aj
Aj
Aj
Aj
A